Lightning Conductor is a 1938 British comedy thriller film directed by Maurice Elvey and starring Gordon Harker, John Lodge and Sally Gray. The screenplay concerns a London bus driver who becomes embroiled in a plot by foreign agents to steal secret documents. It was made at Pinewood Studios.

Cast
 Gordon Harker as Albert Rughouse
 John Lodge as Anderson
 Sally Gray as Mary
 Ernest Thesiger as Professor
 George Moon as George
 Steven Geray as Mortley
 Charles Eaton as Royle
 Arthur Hambling as Bus Inspector
 Roy Findlay as Dakers

Critical reception
Allmovie noted a "breezy British action comedy...No mere programmer, The Lightning Conductor is exceptionally well cast, with such reliables as John Lodge, Sally Gray, Ernst Thesiger and Steven Geray going through their usual expert paces." and TV Guide called it "a suspenseful comedy with some good
characterizations."

References

External links

1938 films
1930s spy comedy films
1930s comedy thriller films
British spy comedy films
British comedy thriller films
1930s English-language films
Films directed by Maurice Elvey
Films shot at Pinewood Studios
Films set in London
Films produced by Anthony Havelock-Allan
British black-and-white films
1938 comedy films
Films scored by Percival Mackey
1930s British films